The Jersey City mayoral election of 2005 was held on May 10, 2005. Democrat Jerramiah Healy was re-elected to a full term, his first, after winning a special election six months earlier.

Results
Jersey City Mayor 
Completed Precincts: 176 of 184 (95.65%)

References

2005 New Jersey elections
Jersey City
2005